Spain competed at the Summer Deaflympics for the twelfth time since making its debut in 1957. Spain sent a delegation consisting of 18 competitors for the multi-sport event. 18 competitors competed in 4 different sports namely; cycling, bowling, Athletics and swimming. 

Jaime Morga Martnez claimed the only medal for Spain during the event by clinching bronze medal in the men's 800m individual event.

Medalists

References

External links 
 Spain at the Deaflympics

Nations at the 2017 Summer Deaflympics
2017 in Spanish sport
Spain at the Deaflympics